Cornwall Glacier is a glacier in the Queen Elizabeth Range, draining eastward, to the south of the Crowell Buttresses, to enter Lowery Glacier. It was named by the northern party of the New Zealand Geological Survey Antarctic Expedition (1961–62) after the English County and Dukedom of Cornwall.

See also
Fopay Peak

References

 

Glaciers of Shackleton Coast